Stéphan Studer (born 9 October 1975) is a Swiss international referee who refereed at 2014 FIFA World Cup qualifiers.

Studer became a FIFA referee in 2009. He has officiated at Euro 2012 qualifiers and the 2011 FIFA U-17 World Cup. He was appointed as referee of the 2012–13 Swiss Cup final between FC Basel and Grasshoppers Zürich in the Stade de Suisse, Wankdorf, Bern, on 20 May 2013.

Studer's last match after 12 years as referee was on 29 May 2015 in St. Jakob-Park, Basel as FC Basel beat St. Gallen 4-3 on the last day of the 2014–15 Swiss Super League season.

References

External links
 Official website

1975 births
Living people
Swiss football referees